Cutlers' Company may refer to at least two trade associations in England:
 The Worshipful Company of Cutlers, in London, chartered 1416
 The Company of Cutlers in Hallamshire, in Sheffield, founded 1624